A list of films produced by the Marathi language film industry based in Maharashtra in the year 1924.

1924 Releases
A list of Marathi films released in 1924.

References

External links
Gomolo - 

Lists of 1924 films by country or language
1924
1924 in Indian cinema